The Mauritanian Parliament (Barlamane/Parlement) is composed of a single chamber, the National Assembly (Al Jamiya al-Wataniyah/Assemblée Nationale). Composed of 157 members, representatives are elected for a five-year term in single-seat constituencies.

Until 2017, the parliament had an upper house, the Senate (Majlis al-Shuyukh/Sénat). The Senate had 56 members, 53 members elected for a six-year term by municipal councillors with one third renewed every two years and 3 members elected by Mauritanians abroad. It was abolished in 2017, after a referendum.

Currently, the National Assessmbly is headed by Cheikh Ahmed Baye who was elected as its president. The last election was on 15 November 2018. In it, the Union for the Republic (UPR), holds the most number of seats.

See also

Politics of Mauritania
List of legislatures by country

References

External links
National Assembly
Senate

Mauritania
Government of Mauritania
Mauritania
Mauritania
Politics of Mauritania
Political organisations based in Mauritania
Mauritania